Mildred DeLois Taylor (born September 13, 1943) is a Newbery Award-winning American young adult novelist. She is best known for her novel Roll of Thunder, Hear My Cry, part of her Logan family series.

Taylor is known for exploring powerful themes of family and racism faced by African Americans in the Deep South, in works that are accessible to young readers. She was awarded the 1977 Newbery Medal for Roll of Thunder, Hear My Cry and the inaugural NSK Neustadt Prize for Children's Literature in 2003. In 2021, she won the Children's Literature Legacy Award.

Biography
Taylor was born in Jackson, Mississippi, in 1943, and is the great-granddaughter of a former slave who was the son of an African-Indian woman and a white landowner. As a young child she moved to Toledo, Ohio, where she attended Toledo's public schools and eventually graduated from the University of Toledo in 1965. She then spent two years with the Peace Corps in Ethiopia, and, after returning to the United States, earned a master's degree in journalism at the University of Colorado where she was instrumental in creating a Black Studies Program as a member of the Black Student Alliance. She now lives in Colorado.

Taylor's books chronicle the lives of several generations of the Logan family, from times of slavery to the Jim Crow era. Her most recognizable work is Roll of Thunder, Hear My Cry (1976), which won the Newbery Medal in 1977 and has been integrated into the language arts curriculum in many classrooms across the United States. "Roll of Thunder" is flanked by several books that include titles such as Song of the Trees (1975), Let the Circle Be Unbroken (1981), The Road to Memphis (1992), and The Land (2001). Her collective contributions to children's literature resulted in her being awarded the inaugural NSK Neustadt Prize for Children's Literature in 2003.

Taylor's works are based on oral history told to her by her father, uncles, and aunt. Taylor has said that without her family, and especially without her father, her books "would not have been". She has stated that these anecdotes became very clear in her mind, and in fact, once she realized that adults talked about the past, "I began to visualize all the family who had once known the land, and I felt as if I knew them, too ..."

Works 

Song of the Trees, 1975
Roll of Thunder, Hear My Cry, 1976
Let the Circle Be Unbroken, 1981
The Gold Cadillac, 1987
The Friendship, 1987
Mississippi Bridge, 1990
The Road To Memphis, 1992
The Well: David's Story, 1995
The Land, 2001
All the Days Past, All the Days to Come, 2020

Awards

Body of Work

NSK Neustadt Prize for Children's Literature, 2003
Children's Literature Legacy Award, 2021

Song of the Trees
First prize (African-American category), Council on Interracial Books for Children, 1973
Outstanding Book of the Year Citation, The New York Times, 1975
Jane Addams Honors Citation, 1976

Roll of Thunder, Hear My Cry
NSK Neustadt Prize for Children's Literature 2003
Jane Addams Honor Citation, 1977
Notable Book Citation, American Library Association, 1976
Newbery Medal, 1977
Buxtehuder Bulle Award, 1985

Let the Circle Be Unbroken
Outstanding Book of the Year Citation, The New York Times, 1981
Jane Addams Honor Citation, 1982
American Book Award nomination, 1982
Coretta Scott King Award, 1982

The Friendship
Coretta Scott King Award, 1988
 Boston Globe–Horn Book Award for fiction, 1988

The Gold Cadillac
Notable Book Citation, The New York Times, 1987
 Christopher Award, 1988

The Road to Memphis
Special Award, Children's Book Council, 1988
Coretta Scott King Award, 1990

Mississippi Bridge
Christopher Award, 1990

The Well: David's Story
Jane Addams Book Award, Jane Addams Peace Council, 1996

The Land
Coretta Scott King Award, 2002, ALA Best Book for Young Adults & Scott O'Dell Award for Historical Fiction

See also

References

External links
 The Mississippi Writers Page: "Mildred D.Taylor" at The University of Mississippi
 The African American Literature Author Profile: Mildred D. Taylor at AALBC.com
 

American children's writers
African-American women writers
American women children's writers
Newbery Medal winners
Peace Corps volunteers
1943 births
Living people
21st-century African-American people
21st-century African-American women
20th-century African-American people
20th-century African-American women